Tom Nelson is a former American football coach.  He was the first head football coach at Azusa Pacific College—now known as Azusa Pacific University—in Azusa, California, serving for one season, in 1965, and compiling a record of 1–6.

References

Year of birth missing (living people)
Possibly living people
Azusa Pacific Cougars football coaches